Daria Zuravicki or Darya Zuravicky (born April 14, 1985 in Albany) is an American former competitive figure skater who competed internationally for Israel. She is the 2001–02 Israeli national champion and was the first skater to represent Israel in the ladies event at an ISU Championship, which she achieved at the 2001 European Figure Skating Championships. Zuravicki was coached by Galina Zmievskaya in Simsbury, Connecticut. She later switched back to competing for the United States but never appeared internationally.

Programs

Competitive highlights 
JGP: Junior Grand Prix

References

External links
 

Israeli female single skaters
American female single skaters
1985 births
Living people
Sportspeople from Albany, New York
21st-century American women